The Sacred Flame is a 1929 film directed by Archie Mayo, starring Pauline Frederick and Conrad Nagel, and based on a 1928 Broadway play of the same title by Somerset Maugham. It is now considered a lost film. Two years later Warner Brothers remade the film in German The Sacred Flame. In 1935, a second remake The Right to Live, was made, starring Colin Clive and George Brent.

Synopsis
Maurice Taylor a former Royal Flying Corps officer, veteran of World War I, marries Stella shortly before a plane crash that leaves him disabled. When his brother Colin arrives in England, she strikes up a close bond with him. Torn between her duty to her husband and her wish to start a new life abroad with his brother, Stella falls under suspicion of murder when her stricken husband dies.

Cast
Pauline Frederick as Mrs. Taylor 
 Conrad Nagel as Colonel Maurice Taylor 
 Lila Lee as Stella Taylor 
 William Courtenay as Major Laconda 
 Walter Byron as Colin Taylor 
 Dale Fuller as Nurse Wayland 
 Alec B. Francis as Doctor Harvester

References

Bibliography
 Goble, Alan. The Complete Index to Literary Sources in Film. Walter de Gruyter, 1999.

External links

1929 romantic drama films
1929 films
American black-and-white films
American romantic drama films
1920s English-language films
American films based on plays
Films based on works by W. Somerset Maugham
Films directed by Archie Mayo
Lost American films
Warner Bros. films
Films set in London
1929 lost films
Lost romantic drama films
1920s American films